Eirenis coronella or crowned dwarf racer, is a non-venomous snake found in the Near and Middle East.

Description 
Eirenis coronella adults range from 25 to 30 cm in length. The head is a little wider than the body, although the body is a little bulky and has smooth dorsal scales. The tail is distinctly narrower than the main body and constitutes about 20% of the total length. The dorsal surface is usually pale brown to grey, with darker bands. They have a thick brown crescent-shaped collar, and the underside is yellowish to white with round brown spots.

Distribution 
The snake is found in Southern Turkey, Jordan, Lebanon, Syria, Egypt (Sinai), Iraq, Western Iran, Northern Saudi Arabia, and Israel.

This species is found in arid, sparsely vegetated mountainous and hilly areas on hard and rocky soils. It can be found between rocks and on the banks of dry wadis. They are often found in agricultural land and other man made habitats (Egan 2007). It is not known from agricultural areas.

Reproduction 
Oviparous, the female lays between three and five eggs in a clutch.

References 

  1837. Essai sur la physionomie des serpens. Partie Générale: xxviii +251 S. + Partie Descriptive: 606 S. + xvi. La Haye (J. Kips, J. HZ. et W. P. van Stockum).
  1969. Lizards and snakes from Southwestern Asia, collected by Henry Field. Bulletin of the Museum of Comparative Zoology 138: 327–406.
  1978. Some rare species of snakes from Turkey. Annalen des Naturhistorischen Museums, Wien 81 [1977]: 261–265.

Eirenis
Fauna of Turkey
Fauna of Jordan
Fauna of Syria
Fauna of Iraq
Fauna of Israel
Flora of Palestine (region)
Reptiles of the Middle East
Endemic fauna of Saudi Arabia